Gerhart von Westerman (19 September 1894 – 14 February 1963) was a German composer, artistic director and music writer.

Life 
Born in Riga, after graduating from high school Westerman studied composition at the Hochschule für Musik in Berlin, where Paul Juon was his teacher. From 1918 he continued his studies with Walter Courvoisier and August Reuß in Munich and received his doctorate in 1921 with a thesis on "Giovanni Porta  als Opernkomponist".

In Munich he became head of department at the radio station in 1925, later at the radio stations in Berlin and Saarbrücken. In 1939 the Berlin Philharmonic appointed him as its artistic director (as successor to Hans von Benda). He held this office until 1945 and then again from 1952 onwards until 1959 from. In 1951 he founded the Berliner Festwochen, which he organized every year from then on until 1959.

Westerman died in Berlin at the age of 68. He is buried at the Waldfriedhof Dahlem. His grave is marked as dedicated as

Works

Orchestral pieces 
Serenade, op. 7, 1928
Intermezzi, op. 9, 1929
Divertimento, op. 16, 1940

Operas 
Prometheische Phantasie, composition and libretto, premiere 1960 in Dortmund
Rosamunde Floris, libretto, music by Boris Blacher, premiere 1960 in Berlin

Books 
 Das russische Volkslied, wie es heute gesungen wird. Orchis Verlag, 1922
 Knaurs Konzertführer. Droemersche Verlagsanstalt, 1951
 Knaurs Opernführer, Droemersche Verlagsanstalt, 1952

Awards
 1962: Berliner Kunstpreis

Further reading 
 Gerhart von Westerman. Eine kleine Monographie. Bote & Bock, Berlin/Wiesbaden 1959 (with contributions by Hans Heinz Stuckenschmidt and Peter Wackernagel, also contains a catalogue raisonné).	
 Friedrich Herzfeld: Das Lexikon der Musik. Ullstein, Frankfurt/Berlin/Vienna 1976.
 Gerhart von Westerman, Karl Schumann: Knaurs Opernführer. paperback Nr. 216.
 Helmut Scheunchen: Lexikon deutschbaltischer Musik. Lexikon deutschbaltischer Musik, Verlag Harro von Hirschheydt, Wedemark-Elze 2002. , .
 , Petra Hörner: . Walter de Gruyter, Berlin 2007, .

References

External links 
 
Bild des Komponisten und Ausführungen zu seinem Kompositionsstil
Bücher von Westerman
 Gerhart-von-Westerman-Archiv at the Academy of Arts, Berlin
 Baltische Historische Kommission Westerman(n), Gerhart v. (1894-1963) on 

1894 births
1963 deaths
Musicians from Riga
20th-century German composers
20th-century classical composers
German opera composers
German opera librettists
Baltic-German people